ITV Network, (also Information TV Pvt Ltd), is a media group founded, owned and promoted by Kartikeya Sharma, the son of Venod Sharma, a politician. Presently, it owns 12 news channels, a Hindi daily, Aaj Samaj, daily newspaper, The Daily Guardian and a weekly newspaper, The Sunday Guardian. ITV Network has leading news channels in the country like NewsX, India News, India News Haryana, India News Rajasthan, India News MPCG and India News Punjab. ITV also runs the Pro Wrestling League, a yearly international wrestling event. India News Haryana Channel added on GSAT-17 Satellite at C-Band. Ajay Shukla is the editor-in-chief while Professor Madhav Nalapat is the Editorial Director of iTV Network.

Channels 
iTV Network operates news channels under two brands, NewsX and India News.

References

Mass media companies of India
Television stations in India
Television broadcasting companies of India
Television networks in India
Broadcasting